The 2001 Cornell Big Red football team was an American football team that represented Cornell University during the 2001 NCAA Division I-AA football season. Cornell finished sixth in the Ivy League. 

In its first season under head coach Tim Pendergast, the team compiled a 2–7 record and was outscored 292 to 187. Justin Dunleavy, Ricky Rahne and Nate Spitler were the team captains. 

The Big Red's 2–5 conference record placed sixth in the Ivy League standings. Cornell was outscored 219 to 120 by Ivy opponents. 

Like most of the Ivy League, Cornell played nine games instead of the usual 10, after the school made the decision to cancel its September 15 season opener against Bucknell, following the September 11 attacks.

Cornell played its home games at Schoellkopf Field in Ithaca, New York.

Schedule

References

Cornell
Cornell Big Red football seasons
Cornell Big Red football